This Light I Hold is the fifth studio album by American metalcore band Memphis May Fire. It was released on the October 28, 2016 by Rise Records. The album debuted at number 42 on the Billboard 200 chart.

It is the last album to have rhythm guitarist Anthony Sepe before his departure in January 2017.

Release and promotion 
The band premiered the first single "Carry On" on BBC Radio 1 on August 28, 2016. On September 23, 2016, Memphis May Fire released the title track and second single to their new album, "This Light I Hold," which features Jacoby Shaddix (Papa Roach), accompanied with a music video. It was also used as one of the theme songs for NXT’s NXT TakeOver: San Antonio

Track listing

Personnel
Memphis May Fire
Matty Mullins - lead vocals, keyboards
Kellen McGregor - lead guitar
Anthony Sepe - rhythm guitar
Cory Elder - bass
Jake Garland - drums

Additional Personnel
Jacoby Shaddix (Papa Roach) - guest vocals on "This Light I Hold"
Larry Soliman (My American Heart) - guest vocals on "Not Over Yet"

Production
Matt Good - Producer, mixing
Ryan Daminson - Engineer
Cameron Mizell - Vocal Producer
Taylor Larson - Mastering

References

2016 albums
Memphis May Fire albums
Rise Records albums
Albums produced by Matt Good